The 1978 Baltimore Colts season was the 26th season for the team in the National Football League (NFL). Under fourth-year head coach Ted Marchibroda, the Colts finished with 5 wins and 11 losses, tied for fourth in the AFC East division with the Buffalo Bills. Baltimore lost the tiebreaker to Buffalo based on head-to-head series (0–2). This was the first time under Marchibroda that Baltimore did not make the postseason.

With quarterback Bert Jones out for several weeks with a shoulder injury, Baltimore started the season in catastrophic fashion, losing their first two games by a combined score of 80–0. The Colts' first win of the season, in week three over New England on Monday Night Football, is one of the biggest regular season upsets in NFL history. The Patriots were favored by an overwhelming 17½ points, but the Colts scored 27 points in the fourth quarter, including a 90-yard kickoff return by running back Joe Washington with under a minute left to take the lead for good. In the game, Washington became the first player to throw a touchdown, catch a pass for a touchdown, and return a kickoff for a touchdown in the same game.

Offseason

NFL draft

Personnel

Staff

Roster

Regular season

Schedule

Results

Week 3

Standings

See also 
 History of the Indianapolis Colts
 Indianapolis Colts seasons
 Colts–Patriots rivalry

References 

Baltimore Colts
1978
Baltimore Colts